Haloterrigena (common abbreviation Htg.) is a genus of the Natrialbaceae.

Taxonomy

Species formerly placed in this taxon
 Haloterrigena daqingensis, now Natronorubrum daqingense
 Haloterrigena hispanica, now Natrinema hispanicum
 Haloterrigena limicola, now Natrinema limicola
 Haloterrigena longa, now Natrinema longum
 Haloterrigena mahii, now Natrinema mahii
 Haloterrigena saccharevitans, now Natrinema saccharevitans
 Haloterrigena thermotolerans, now Natrinema thermotolerans

H. jeotgali is proposed to be a synonym of Natrinema thermotolerans, but as of 2022, is still considered a valid name.

References

Further reading

Scientific journals

Scientific books

Scientific databases

External links

Archaea genera
Halobacteria
Taxa described in 1999